Chris Finch may refer to: 

 Chris Finch (basketball) (born 1969), American basketball player and coach
 Chris Finch (cricketer) (born 1975),  former cricketer from New Zealand
 Chris Finch, a character played by Ralph Ineson on The Office (British TV series)